Chovan (Slovak feminine: Chovanová) is a surname. It is usually of Slovak or Czech origin. Notable people with the surname include:

 Adrián Chovan (born 1995), Slovak football player
 Martin Chovan (born 1986), Slovak ice hockey player
 Matúš Chovan (born 1992), Slovak ice hockey player
 Michal Chovan (born 1987), Slovak ice hockey player
 Vladimír Chovan (born 1963), Slovak politician

See also

References

Slovak-language surnames